This is a timeline of the Jurchens.

8th century

10th century

11th century

12th century

1100s

1110s

1120s

1130s

1140s

1150s

1160s

1170s

1180s

1190s

13th century

1200s

1210s

1220s

1230s

1280s

15th century

1400s

1410s

1420s

1430s

1440s

1460s

1470s

1480s

16th century

1520s

1540s

1570s

1580s

1590s

17th century

1600s

1610s

1620s

1630s

See also
Timeline of the Song dynasty
Timeline of the Ming dynasty
Timeline of the Tanguts
Timeline of the Khitans

References

Bibliography

 .

 (alk. paper)

 

  (paperback).
 
 

 
 .

 

 
 
 

 
 

 

 
  
 

 
 

History of Manchuria
Ancient peoples of China
Tungusic peoples
Timelines of Chinese peoples